Stephen Govier (born 6 April 1952) is a former professional footballer.

Govier, a centre-back, began his career with Norwich City, for whom he played 30 games (scoring twice) and was a member of the squad that won the second division championship in 1972.

After leaving Carrow Road in 1974 he played for Brighton and Grimsby Town.

References

1952 births
Govier Steve
Norwich City F.C. players
Brighton & Hove Albion F.C. players
Grimsby Town F.C. players
Living people
Association football central defenders